Todo Está Bien (English: All is Good) is a studio album by Mexican singer Juan Gabriel, released on October 26, 1999.

Track listing

Sales and certifications

References

External links 
Juan Gabriel official myspace site
 Todo Esta Bien on amazon.com
 Todo Esta Bien on cduniverse.com

Juan Gabriel albums
Spanish-language albums
1999 albums
RCA Records albums